Theodore Seixas Solomons (1870–1947) was an explorer and early member of the Sierra Club.  From 1892 to 1897 he explored and named the Mount Goddard, Evolution Valley and Evolution Basin region in what is now northern Kings Canyon National Park in eastern California.  He was instrumental in envisioning, exploring, and establishing the route of what became the John Muir Trail from Yosemite Valley along the crest of the Sierra Nevada to Mount Whitney

Biography

Early life and ancestors
He was born in San Francisco, California on July 20, 1870, 
the second son and the fifth of seven children of Hannah Marks, an influential San Francisco educator and civic worker and Gershom Mendes Seixas Solomons. He had relocated to San Francisco from New York City during the Gold Rush, and founded Congregation Emanu-El in 1854. He was also the first president of any West Coast lodge of B'nai B'rith. His great-grandfather was Gershom Mendes Seixas (1745–1816), the "Patriot Rabbi", the first native-born Rabbi in the United States.

Solomons later recalled that the idea that resulted in the John Muir Trail originated in his adolescence. "The idea of a crest-parallel trail came to me one day while herding my uncle's cattle in an immense unfenced alfalfa field near Fresno.  It was 1884 and I was 14."

Marriage and family
Solomons married three times. He married as his first wife, on March 29, 1901, at Dawson Creek, British Columbia, Canada, Rozella M. Gould of Dawson Creek.  They were later divorced. There were no children from this marriage. He married on January 8, 1909, in New York City, as his second wife, Katherine Gray Church, born on May 6, 1881, in New York City the only daughter of Henry Seymour Church and Margaretta Josephine Gray. She died on February 7, 1971, in Cherryland, Alameda County, California. Her mother, a published writer and singer, was born into a family with deep New England roots that trace back to the Rev. Mr. Blackleach Burritt, and Governor Thomas Welles. After his second wife was committed to a mental institution, he married Yvonne Robinson who died in 1965. They had no children.

Theodore and Katherine were the parents of three children: Eleanor Susan Brownell Anthony "Toni" Solomons (1911–2006), David Seixas Solomons (1913–1961), and Leon Henry Solomons (1915–1988). Eleanor was married to Israeli biologist Benjamin Elazari Volcani.

Explorations
In his explorations, Solomons correctly determined the courses of the upper branches of the San Joaquin River.  In 1892, accompanied by Joseph Nisbet LeConte and Sidney I. Peixotto, he crossed from Mount Lyell by way of Rush Creek to the base of Mount Ritter and ascended the peak.  In 1895, Solomons took his most notable trip, accompanied by Ernest C. Bonner.  Ascending the South Fork of the San Joaquin they came to the group of mountains now designated the Evolution Group, named by Solomons. The highest of these he called Mount Darwin (after the evolutionist Charles Darwin), and the others he named Haeckel, Wallace, Fiske, Spencer, and Huxley, after famous evolutionists of the day.  Continuing their explorations, Solomons and Bonner ascended Mount Goddard, then made their way down to Simpson Meadow via North Goddard Creek, and were the first to make this section known.

Solomons’ excursions in the next two years added details to the knowledge of Sierra topography, but his principal contribution was an accurate map which he drafted and presented to the Sierra Club in 1896.

Death and memorials
He died in Los Angeles, California on May 27, 1947. Mount Solomons (13016') is named after him as well as the long-distance trail the Theodore Solomons Trail.

Notes

References

Works cited
Dexter, Franklin Bowditch.Biographical sketches of the graduates of Yale college with annals of the college history ... Volume 3 of Biographical Sketches of the Graduates of Yale College with Annals of the College History  Publisher: Holt & Company, 1903.
Jordan, John W. Genealogical and personal history of the Allegheny Valley, Pennsylvania. New York: Lewis Historical Pub. Company 1913.
Raymond, Marcius Denison. Gray genealogy : being a genealogical record and history of the descendants of John Gray, of Beverly, Mass., and also including sketches of other Gray families. New York: Higginson Book Company, 1887.
Raymond, Marcius D. Sketch of Rev. Blackleach Burritt and related Stratford families : a paper read before the Fairfield County Historical Society, at Bridgeport, Conn., Friday evening, Feb. 19, 1892. Bridgeport : Fairfield County Historical Society 1892.
Sargent, Shirley. Solomons of the Sierra: The Pioneer of the John Muir Trail Yosemite, California. Publisher: Flying Spur Press , 1990.
Siemiatkoski, Donna Holt.The Descendants of Governor Thomas Welles of Connecticut, 1590–1658, and His Wife, Alice Tomes Baltimore: Publisher Gateway Press, 1990.
Wineapple, Brenda.Sister Brother: Gertrude and Leo Stein   Publisher: Lincoln, Nebraska. University of Nebraska Press, 2008

Further reading
Sierra Club Bulletin, 1894, I, 3, pp. 61–84, 1895, I, 6, pp. 221–237.
Appalachia, January 1896, pp. 41–57
Overland Monthly, May, June, August, November, 1896, and July, August, 1897.

1870 births
1947 deaths
Sierra Club people
Explorers of California
American explorers
History of the Sierra Nevada (United States)
Jewish-American history
American people of Portuguese-Jewish descent
American Sephardic Jews
Jewish American writers
American conservationists
American essayists
American geologists
American mountain climbers
American naturalists
American nature writers
American male non-fiction writers
Writers from San Francisco
Activists from California